The Wrights Range Lights are a set of range lights on Prince Edward Island, Canada. They were built in 1894, and are still active.

See also
 List of lighthouses in Prince Edward Island
 List of lighthouses in Canada

References

External links
 Aids to Navigation Canadian Coast Guard

Lighthouses completed in 1894
Lighthouses in Prince Edward Island
Buildings and structures in Queens County, Prince Edward Island